The 1968 Georgia Bulldogs football team represented the Georgia Bulldogs of the University of Georgia during the 1968 NCAA University Division football season. The team was named national champion by NCAA-designated major selector Litkenhous.

Schedule

Roster

References

Georgia
Georgia Bulldogs football seasons
College football national champions
Southeastern Conference football champion seasons
Georgia Bulldogs football